Vitaliy Oleksandovych Polyanskyi (born 26 January 1981 in Dnipropetrovsk) is a Ukrainian judoka, who competed in the men's heavyweight category. He held two Ukrainian titles in both his own division and the open event, picked up a bronze medal at the 2007 Summer Universiade in Bangkok, Thailand, and represented his nation Ukraine at the 2004 Summer Olympics.

Polyanskyy was selected to the Ukrainian squad in the men's heavyweight class (+100 kg) at the 2004 Summer Olympics in Athens, as a result of the nation's top nine finish in the European Judo Union ranking list. Polyanskyy opened his match with a brilliant ippon victory and an ōuchi gari (big inner reap) over Egypt's Islam El Shehaby, before he fell in his next bout with a waza-ari awasete ippon defeat to Italy's Paolo Bianchessi. With Bianchessi moving forward to the medal podium phase, Polyanskyy gave himself a chance for an Olympic bronze medal through the repechage round, but lost to South Korea's Kim Sung-bum by an ippon and a tani otoshi (valley drop) within a halfway time into their first playoff of the draft.

References

External links
 

1981 births
Living people
Ukrainian male judoka
Olympic judoka of Ukraine
Judoka at the 2004 Summer Olympics
Sportspeople from Dnipro
Universiade medalists in judo
Universiade bronze medalists for Ukraine
Medalists at the 2007 Summer Universiade
21st-century Ukrainian people